Patricia McConnel (born 1931) is an American writer living in Arizona, best known for her autobiographical novel Sing Soft, Sing Loud (1989) based on her life as a drug mule and prisoner.

Awards 

 Awarded two creative writing fellowships from the National Endowment for the Arts 
 1984 The Avarian was selected as one of the Ten best PEN short stories of 1984

References 

1931 births
20th-century American writers
Living people
Writers from Arizona